The Dennis-Coxetter House is a historic house located at the junction of Bond Street and State Road 59 in Lloyd, Florida.  It was added to the National Register of Historic Places on October 20, 1988.

The house is one of the earliest buildings of the agricultural village of Lloyd, founded in 1859.  It was a summer residence of a leading plantation family of Leon County and Jefferson County.

References

Gallery

Houses on the National Register of Historic Places in Florida
National Register of Historic Places in Jefferson County, Florida
Houses in Jefferson County, Florida
Vernacular architecture in Florida